Arthrospira platensis is a filamentous, gram-negative cyanobacterium. This bacterium is non-nitrogen-fixing photoautotroph. It has been isolated in Chenghai Lake, China, soda lakes of East Africa, and subtropical, alkaline lakes.

Morphology 
Arthrospira platensis is filamentous, motile bacterium. Motility has been described as a vigorous gliding without a visible flagella.

Metabolism 
As a photoautotroph the major carbon source is carbon dioxide and water is a source of electrons to perform CO2 reduction.

Genetics 
Arthrospira platensis has a single circular chromosome containing 6.8 Mb and 6,631 genes. The G+C content has been determined to be 44.3%.

Growth conditions 
Arthrospira platensis has been found in environments with high concentrations of carbonate and bicarbonate. It can also be found in high salt concentrations because of its alkali and salt tolerance. The temperature optimum for this organism is around 35 °C. Based on environmental conditions, culture medium often has a pH between 9-10, inorganic salts, and a high bicarbonate concentration.

Uses 
There are various present and past uses of A. platensis as food or food supplement, which is better known as 'Spirulina' in this context. Spirulina is sold as a health supplement in the form of powder or tablets due to its high levels of essential and unsaturated fatty acids, vitamins, dietary minerals, and antioxidants. After the Chernobyl disaster, Spirulina was given to victims due to its antioxidant properties to avoid adverse effects of reactive oxygen species. Proteins extracted from A. platensis can be used in food as thickening agents or stabilizers of emulsions or foams. The light-harvesting complex of A. platensis, phycocyanin, can be extracted as a blue pigment powder and used as blue colorant in food. As A. platensis cells contain hydrogenases and can produce hydrogen, they are a candidate for the production of renewable energy.

References 

Oscillatoriales